Act Against Bullying (AAB) is a United Kingdom charity. It was founded in 2003 by Louise Burfitt-Dons. The charity's purpose is to help bullied children by providing them with confidential advice and to raise public awareness of the problem. The AAB website offers supportive messages and information on all forms of systematic bullying, in particular psychological bullying. The site also features advice on forms of bullying such as exclusion bullying and cyberbullying.

The charity uses an all-volunteer staff.

It has helped in situations where children and their parents had previously worked alone through their anti-bullying experiences. The ethos of the charity is motivational and upbeat. It aims to eliminate suicides and homicides that result from bullying. It actively promotes the virtues of kindness as the antithesis of bullying actions.

History
In 2000, playwright Louise Burfitt-Dons (born Louise Byres) published in 2001 40 anti-bullying monologues called Act Against Bullying for teachers to use in the classroom, because her daughter had been bullied at school. Burfitt-Dons was concerned that the advice given to victims to simply report the abuse could lead to further abuse. The monologues reported the insidiousness of the newer forms of bullying and offered an insight into what they could do. "I didn't realise what I had started," said Burfitt-Dons.

The voluntary organisation Act Against Bullying formed in 2002. The group began to issue advisory leaflets that profiled "exclusion to cause distress" based on deliberate isolation from a community. The group targets children/people that have the mental capacity to carry out abusive actions toward others but do not realise the long-term impact of those actions. The organisation provided coping tips for teenage victims. The organisation began attracting funds and registered with the Charity Commission in October 2003.

The Act Against Bullying Polo Cup started in June 2005 at the Guards Polo Club as part of the semi-final of the Queens Cup Tournament. Burfitt-Dons presented the Cup to the Dubai Polo Team in 2005 and 2006. In 2007 it went to the Ellerston White polo team.

The charity launched the poster campaign Grade Not Degrade in November 2006.

She was guest speaker at a House of Commons cyberbullying forum in June 2007 that was chaired by Shadow Minister for Children Tim Loughton.

AAB was shortlisted for The Guardian Charity Award 2008.

The Cyberkind campaign was launched at the House of Lords on Armistice Day 2009 by Baroness Hayman and Lord Grocott.

It was a core member of the UK's Anti-Bullying Alliance until 2010.

Programs

Wristband
A two colour silicone wristband adopts red as a symbol for strength and white for peace.

Cool to be Kind campaign 
Cool To Be Kind is the major campaign of the charity and started in 2001 as a round of school talks on bullying. The motto was 'Don't be Rude, Don't Exclude, Don't Push In, Don't Hurt To Win, It's Cool to be Kind'. The campaign has since 2005 been celebrated in November during Anti-Bullying Week. To participate in this annual event, schools download resources from the AAB website, such as assembly notices and posters, AAB kindness certificates for presentations to reward anti-bullying behaviour.

CyberKind  
Cyber-bullying can be done anonymously. Encouraging and rewarding 'niceness on the net' is their approach to eliminate the practice as an acceptable activity.

Act Against Bullying Polo Cup 
This Cup was presented annually from 2005–2007 to the winner of the group's polo tournament.

Public education 
Burfitt-Dons gives speeches to raise awareness of the rising statistics and varying forms of bullying and its adverse effect on youth culture, female aggression, and trends like happy slapping.

Grade Not Degrade campaign 
The group wrote to all TV channels and OFCOM calling for a reduction in gratuitous aggression in TV programmes and in the media believing it to be a fundamental and pervasive source of copycat bullying abuse and violence in schools and society. There were posters.

Public profile 
Act Against Bullying maintains a strong media presence which stimulated controversy owing to its glamorous profile. It recruited notable voluntary advisors including Hamish Brown MBE, the UK's leading authority on the Protection from Harassment Act 1997 and ex-Fire Commissioner Brian Robinson. Many celebrities appeared in support at its fundraising events including Hayley Westenra and Duaine Ladejo.

Big Brother participant Jade Goody helped after she was brought as a guest to the Act Against Bullying Cup in 2005. The group ended its association with Goody in January 2007 after Goody's alleged racist bullying behaviour towards another Celebrity Big Brother contestant. The charity removed a photograph of Goody and published a statement on their website that criticised the confrontational format of the Channel 4 show which gave the impression that Goody's behaviour was condoned. The statement was posted on the Digital Spy Forum by a viewer including the allegation that Goody was the charity's patron. On 16 January 2007, the national media published the story and AAB was inundated with angry and abusive emails. On the same day, Burfitt-Dons appeared on UK television to explain that Goody was ever a spokesperson or officially linked with the organisation. She claimed that Goody had been brought along as a guest at a function where she had bid for polo lessons with Jack Kidd (see Jodie Kidd) who was a supporter.

Other celebrities attending that day were Nick Knowles and Julian Bennett. She made a further donation to AAB in 2006 following Goody's mother Jackiey Budden's appearance on a homemaker TV show. Burfitt-Dons published a further statement expressing admiration for the way in which the victim Shilpa Shetty had dealt with the bullying. Shilpa Shetty's management contacted AAB to offer Shilpa's support for the charity.

Other media personalities linked with AAB are Jen Hunter who was publicly humiliated on a TV show over her height. Big Brother contestant Liza Jeynes contacted AAB for support over her suicide attempts from cyberbullying. AAB has a young following. Joseph McManners was photographed for them when he attended a function with Hugo Boss model Nicholas Joyce. They worked with Britain's Got Talent 2008 finalists martial arts duo Strike.

In 2008 Fashion Showcase Wales sponsored by L'Oréal was held in support of the charity at the Sophia Gardens in Cardiff in AAB campaign posters and messages featured in The Inbetweeners Movie.

References

External links
 Act Against Bullying website

Children's charities based in the United Kingdom
Children's websites
Anti-bullying charities
2003 establishments in the United Kingdom
Organizations established in 2003